The David di Donatello Award for Best New Director (Italian: David di Donatello per il miglior regista esordiente) is a film award presented annually by the Accademia del Cinema Italiano (ACI, Academy of Italian Cinema) to recognize the outstanding feature-film directorial debut of a film director who has worked within the Italian film industry during the year preceding the ceremony. The award was first handled out in 1982. 

Nominees and winners are selected via runoff voting by all members of the Accademia.

Winners and nominees
Below, winners are listed first in the colored row, followed by other nominees.

1980s

1990s

2000s

2010s

2020s

See also 
 Nastro d'Argento for Best New Director
 Cinema of Italy

References

External links
 
 Daviddidonatello.it (official website)

David di Donatello
Directorial debut film awards